Weekly, The Weekly, or variations, may refer to:

News media
Weekly (news magazine), an English-language national news magazine published in Mauritius
Weekly newspaper, any newspaper published on a weekly schedule
Alternative newspaper, also known as alternative weekly, a newspaper with magazine-style feature stories
The Weekly with Charlie Pickering, an Australian satirical news program
The Weekly with Wendy Mesley, a Canadian Sunday morning news talk show
The Weekly, the original name of the television documentary series The New York Times Presents

Other
Weekley, a village in Northamptonshire, UK
Weeekly, a South Korean girl-group

See also

Weekly News (disambiguation)
Weekley (surname)